Crocus goulimyi, the fall crocus, is a species of flowering plant in the genus Crocus and the family Iridaceae. It is endemic to Greece. The small, rounded, lilac flowers with paler throats appear in autumn.

It was named in honour of the Greek amateur botanist Constantine Goulimis (1886-1963).

This plant and the cultivar C. goulimyi subsp. goulimyi 'Mani White' have gained the Royal Horticultural Society's Award of Garden Merit.

References

goulimyi
Flora of Greece
Plants described in 1955